Arshad Nawaz (born 25 May 1955) is a Pakistani former cricketer. He played twenty-two first-class cricket matches for several domestic sides in Pakistan between 1971 and 1986.

See also
 List of Pakistan Automobiles Corporation cricketers

References

External links
 

1955 births
Living people
Pakistani cricketers
House Building Finance Corporation cricketers
Karachi cricketers
Pakistan Automobiles Corporation cricketers
Cricketers from Sargodha